Princess Marie of Prussia (Marie Elisabeth Luise Friederike; 14 September 1855, Marmorpalais, Potsdam – 20 June 1888, Dresden), was a princess of the House of Hohenzollern. She was the daughter of Prince Frederick Charles of Prussia and later became second wife of Prince Henry of the Netherlands then the first wife of Prince Albert of Saxe-Altenburg. She was also the great-niece of Wilhelm I, German Emperor.

Life

Princess Marie was the eldest daughter of Prussian field-marshal Prince Frederick Charles of Prussia (1828–1885) and his wife, Princess Maria Anna of Anhalt-Dessau (1837–1906). Marie's mother was the youngest daughter of Leopold IV, Duke of Anhalt and Princess Friederike of Prussia.

On 23 August 1878 Princess Marie married Prince Henry of Orange-Nassau at the Neuen Palais (1820–1879), who had since 1850 been Governor of Luxembourg and Admiralleutnant zur See. He was the third son of the King William II of the Netherlands and Grand Duchess Anna Pavlovna of Russia. The marriage between Marie and Henry was arranged in an attempt to save the House of Orange-Nassau from extinction but it was to prove childless: barely five months later, in January 1879, Prince Henry died after contracting measles.

Six years later, on 6 May 1885, Princess Marie married Prince Albert of Saxe-Altenburg in Berlin (1843–1902), a son of Prince Eduard of Saxe-Altenburg and his second wife, Princess Luise Caroline Reuss zu Greiz. This marriage was to all reports a harmonious one and produced two children:
 Princess Olga of Saxe-Altenburg (1886–1955); married on 20 May 1913 Count Carl Friedrich von Pückler-Burghauss (1886–1945).
 Princess Marie of Saxe-Altenburg (1888–1947); married on 20 April 1911 in Altenburg, Prince Heinrich XXXV Reuss of Köstritz (b. 1 August 1887, Mauer – d. 17 January 1936, Loschwitz) son of Heinrich VII, Prince Reuss of Köstritz). They had one daughter before divorcing in 1921:
Marie Helene Reuss of Köstritz (b. 23 February 1912, Silesia - d. 1 August 1933, Korfantow)

The princess died at Schloss Abrechtesberg in 1888 from the effects of puerperal fever and was buried in the Saxe-Altenburg family vault. Her second husband remarried in 1891 to Duchess Helene of Mecklenburg-Strelitz in Remplin (1857–1936), a niece of Friedrich Wilhelm, Grand Duke of Mecklenburg-Strelitz, and granddaughter of Grand Duke Michael Pavlovich of Russia.

Princess Marie was godmother to her nephew Prince Arthur of Connaught, only son of her sister Princess Louise Margaret of Prussia. The christening occurred in the private chapel at Windsor Castle.

Ancestry

Bibliography
 C. Arnold McNaughton: The Book of Kings: A Royal Genealogy, in 3 volumes (London, U.K.: Garnstone Press, 1973), volume 1, page 66.

References

External links

1855 births
1888 deaths
House of Hohenzollern
Dutch princesses
Prussian princesses
People from Potsdam
Princesses of Saxe-Altenburg
Deaths in childbirth
Royal reburials